The County of Grant is one of the 37 counties of Victoria which are part of the cadastral divisions of Australia, used for land titles. It is located to the west of Melbourne, on the west side of Port Phillip and includes Geelong. Ballarat is on its north-western edge. It is bounded in the west by the Yarrowee River, on the north by the Great Dividing Range and on the east by the Werribee River. The county was proclaimed in 1853.

The Darriwilian Age of the Ordovician Period of geological time is named for Darriwil parish in the county.

Parishes 
Parishes within the county:
 Anakie, Victoria
 Ballark, Victoria
 Ballarat, Victoria (also in the counties of Grant, Grenville, Ripon & Talbot)
 Balliang, Victoria
 Bamganie, Victoria
 Barrarbool, Victoria
 Bellarine, Victoria
 Beremboke, Victoria
 Borhoneyghurk, Victoria
 Bulban, Victoria
 Bungal, Victoria
Bungaree, Victoria (also in the counties of Grenville & Talbot)
 Bungeeltap, Victoria
 Buninyong, Victoria
 Burtwarrah, Victoria
 Cargerie, Victoria
 Carrah, Victoria
 Carrung-e-murnong, Victoria
 Clarendon, Victoria
 Cocoroc, Victoria
 Conewarre, Victoria
 Coolebarghurk, Victoria
 Corio, Victoria
 Darriwil, Victoria
 Dean, Victoria (also in the county of Talbot)
 Duneed, Victoria
 Durdidwarrah, Victoria
 Gherang Gherang, Victoria
 Gherineghap, Victoria
 Gnarwarre, Victoria
 Gorong, Victoria
 Gorrockburkghap, Victoria
 Jan Juc, Victoria
 Kerrit Bareet, Victoria
 Korweinguboora, Victoria
 Lake Lake Wollard, Victoria
 Lal Lal, Victoria
 Lara, Victoria
 Mambourin, Victoria
 Meredith, Victoria
 Modewarre, Victoria
 Moolap, Victoria
 Mooradoranook, Victoria
 Moorarbool West, Victoria
 Moorpanyal, Victoria
 Moranghurk, Victoria
 Moreep, Victoria
 Mouyong, Victoria
 Murgheboluc, Victoria
 Murtcaim, Victoria
 Narmbool, Victoria
 Paraparap, Victoria
 Parwan, Victoria
 Paywit, Victoria
 Puebla, Victoria
 Tutegong, Victoria
 Wabdallah, Victoria
 Warrenheip, Victoria
 Werribee, Victoria
 Woornyalook, Victoria
 Wormbete, Victoria
 Wurdi-Youang, Victoria
 Yaloak, Victoria
 Yowang, Victoria

References
Vicnames, place name details
Research aids, Victoria 1910
 Map of the county of Grant showing colony and county boundaries, 1886. National Library of Australia

Counties of Victoria (Australia)
Barwon South West (region)